The WSK Super Master Series is a kart racing competition organised by the WSK. Its inaugural season took place in 2010. Today, the series holds championships in four karting categories: KZ2, OK, OKJ and 60 Mini. Notable champions have been Formula One drivers Antonio Giovinazzi and Max Verstappen.

KZ1 Champions

KZ2 Champions

KF2 Class/KF Class/OK Class Champions

KF3/KF Junior/OK Junior Class Champions

60 Mini Champions

See also 

 WSK Champions Cup
 WSK Euro Series
 WSK Final Cup

References 

European auto racing series
Recurring sporting events established in 2010